"Maybe It Was Memphis" is a song recorded by American country music artist Pam Tillis on two occasions. The second recording was released in 1991 as the fourth single from her album Put Yourself in My Place.

History

The song was first recorded by Phil Seymour whose bass player, Michael Anderson, wrote the song. Seymour's version was released posthumously in 2001 on the expanded version of his 2nd Boardwalk album "Phil Seymour 2."
It was produced by Richard Podolor.

Tillis first cut the song on Warner Bros. Records in the late 1980s under the production of Josh Leo, but did not release this version until Warner issued the album Pam Tillis Collection in the mid-1990s.

Her second and most successful version of the song was recorded on her 1991 album Put Yourself in My Place. It was released in November 1991 as the album's fourth single and became her third Top Ten hit on the Billboard country charts, peaking at number 3 in February 1992. "Maybe It Was Memphis" was also nominated for the Country Music Association's Song of the Year in 1992. This version also earned Tillis a Grammy nomination for Best Country Vocal Performance, Female.

According to Arista Records' then-senior director of marketing Mike Dungan, executives were reluctant to release the song due to its more pop sound, and held off on doing so until Tillis had established herself.

Content
The song is a mid-tempo ballad in which the female narrator recalls a former lover whom she met in Memphis, Tennessee. It is composed in the key of A major with a vocal range of A-E. The main chord pattern on the verses is A-D twice, E-D twice, and E-G-A.

Michael Anderson wrote the song in 1983. In an article for TAXI, he described the song writing process:

American Idol & The Voice
On May 24, 2011, Lauren Alaina performed the song during the finale of American Idol. Carrie Underwood selected the song as part of the round of competition in which each contestant's idol chose their song. On May 8, 2013, during the live rounds of the fourth season of The Voice, Danielle Bradbery from Blake Shelton's team sang it as her song.

Chart positions

Year-end charts

Danielle Bradbery

References

1991 singles
Pam Tillis songs
Songs about Memphis, Tennessee
Song recordings produced by Paul Worley
Song recordings produced by Josh Leo
Warner Records singles
Arista Nashville singles
1991 songs